Erkki Olavi Kataja (19 June 1924 in Kuusankoski – 27 April 1969) was a Finnish athlete, who competed mainly in the pole vault.

He competed for Finland in the 1948 Summer Olympics held in London, Great Britain where he won the silver medal in the pole vault event.

1924 births
1969 deaths
People from Kuusankoski
Finnish male pole vaulters
Olympic silver medalists for Finland
Athletes (track and field) at the 1948 Summer Olympics
Athletes (track and field) at the 1952 Summer Olympics
Olympic athletes of Finland
Medalists at the 1948 Summer Olympics
Olympic silver medalists in athletics (track and field)
Sportspeople from Kymenlaakso